Philip Richard Chapple (born 26 November 1966) is an English former professional footballer.

Chapple began his career with Cambridge United after coming through the youth teams at Norwich City. He was part of the Us defence which gained consecutive promotions in 1989–90 and 1990–91. He joined Charlton Athletic in 1993 and spent five seasons at The Valley before ending his career at Peterborough United.

After retiring from playing Chapple took up coaching roles at Peterborough United and West Ham United before becoming chief scout back at Charlton. After a brief spell at Fulham Chapple was appointed European scout at Brighton & Hove Albion. In September 2019 Chapple joined Stoke City as head of first-team recruitment until February 2020.

Playing career
A centre back who started his career with Norwich City, he failed to make the breakthrough and joined Cambridge United on a free transfer in March 1988. During his time at The Abbey Stadium, Chapple went on to feature in the club's most successful seasons, culminating in a rise from Division 4 to Division 2 in successive seasons. In total Chapple made 187 league appearances for the club, scoring an impressive 19 goals.

Charlton Athletic paid £100,000 for his services in 1993 and he went on to have a 5-year playing career at The Valley, scoring 15 goals in 141 games before joining Peterborough United in 1998. Chapple endured an injury ravaged time at London Road and only managed 17 games and one goal before retiring from playing.

Scouting career
Chapple stayed at Peterborough in a number of roles including Youth Team Coach, Scout and Head Coach before leaving in September 2003.

He had spells as academy coach at West Ham United and as a coach at Newmarket Town and in 2007 returned to Charlton Athletic as chief scout. When Charlton named Phil Parkinson as caretaker manager in November 2008, Phil briefly joined the first-team coaching set-up before returning to his Chief Scout role in July 2009. He remained at Charlton until September 2015 when he joined Fulham. He was appointed European scout at Brighton & Hove Albion in December 2016.

In September 2019 he was appointed as head of first-team recruitment at Stoke City. He left Stoke in February 2020.

Career statistics
Source:

References

External links

1966 births
Living people
Association football defenders
Norwich City F.C. players
Cambridge United F.C. players
Charlton Athletic F.C. players
Peterborough United F.C. players
Footballers from Norwich
English footballers
Peterborough United F.C. non-playing staff
West Ham United F.C. non-playing staff
Charlton Athletic F.C. non-playing staff
Brighton & Hove Albion F.C. non-playing staff
Stoke City F.C. non-playing staff
Fulham F.C. non-playing staff
Norwich City F.C. non-playing staff
Luton Town F.C. non-playing staff